Boom Mountain is located north of Vermilion Pass on the border of Alberta and British Columbia on the Continental Divide. It was named in 1908 after Boom Lake which is located right under the mountain.  When viewed by an Alpine Club of Canada expedition, a buildup of logs on the lake resembled a log boom.


Geology

Boom Mountain is composed of sedimentary rock laid down from the Precambrian to Jurassic periods. Formed in shallow seas, this sedimentary rock was pushed east and over the top of younger rock during the Laramide orogeny.

Climate

Based on the Köppen climate classification, Boom Mountain is located in a subarctic climate with cold, snowy winters, and mild summers. Temperatures can drop below -20 °C with wind chill factors below -30 °C.

See also
List of peaks on the Alberta–British Columbia border

References

External links
 Boom Mountain: Flickr

Two-thousanders of Alberta
Two-thousanders of British Columbia
Mountains of Banff National Park
Canadian Rockies